Joëlle le Bussy Fal is a Franco-Senegalese sculptor, art dealer, arts organizer, and art curator based in Dakar, Senegal, where she founded Galerie Arte in 1996.

Biography 
Of Belgian-Congolese origin, Joëlle le Bussy was born 1 February 1958, in Mont-de-Marsan, France. She founded Galerie Arte in 1996 in the Plateau district of Dakar. Since 2009, the gallery has had a branch in Saint-Louis du Senegal, a city classified as a World Heritage Site. She is also President of the Association for the Promotion of Visual Arts (PAVA) in Africa. In 2009, she was appointed President of Arts and Letters by Amadou Diaw, Secretary General of Saint-Louis, 350. She has since founded the contemporary art festival, Le Fleuve en Couleurs, and through this vehicle, the city of Saint-Louis has become the kick-off point for the Dakar Biennale. The Fleuve en Couleurs is an event organized annually.

Joëlle le Bussy Fal's gallery offers furniture and precious wood objects from the African continent, which she designs and commissions in her Dakar workshops from experienced Casamance craftsmen. The gallery also exhibits many African artists (painters or sculptors) and promotes handicrafts, jewelry and fabrics from West Africa.

Career

Exhibition curator 

 2000–2005: member of the scientific council of the Dakar Biennale des Arts
 2005–2007: The Viaduc des Arts, Paris, France .
 2008–2009: exhibition at the Grand Chancellery of the Légion d’Honneur, Paris, France
 2005: La Fabrique de la Gare, Bonnieux, France
 2009: La Petite Tulière, Grignan, France

Arts Organization Work in Saint-Louis 

 2009–2010: President of Arts and Letters of Saint-Louis 350 (given during the celebration of the city's 350th anniversary)
 2010–2012: founder of the visual arts event, Le Fleuve en Couleurs
 2010–2012: organization of the Biennale des Arts Off in Dakar
 2010: curator of the Carte blanche exhibition at the Galerie Arte, at the Institut français
 2012: organizer of the Jam-Salam exhibition with residences of Moroccan and Senegalese artists

Expertise in Craftsmanship 

 2002–2007: member of the selection jury at the SIAO (International Handicrafts Fair of Ouagadougou, Burkina-Faso)
 2009–2011: president of the jury for the Unesco Award of Excellence, Bamako, Mali
 2012: member of the selection jury at the SIAO

Designer 

 1998: founded design studio and cabinet-making workshop in Dakar, Senegal
 2005: exhibition at Salon Cocoon, Brussels, Belgium
 2006: workshop of international designers in the workshops of Joëlle le Bussy, Biennale des Arts de Dakar, Senegal
 2008–2009: exhibition at the New York Gift Fair, New York City, United States
 2009–2010: exhibition at ICFF, New York, United States
 2011: exhibition at Maison et Objets fair, Paris, France 
 2008: design prize at the Dakar Biennale of Contemporary African Art

Design teacher 
Joëlle le Bussy Fal has been teaching introductory design courses since 2012 at Gaston Berger University in Saint-Louis, Senegal.

References

External links 

 Joëlle le Bussy Fal Official site
 Galerie Arte Official site
 The River in Colors Official site

Senegalese artists
People from Saint-Louis, Senegal
Women art dealers
Living people
1958 births